The 2011 Asia-Pacific Rally Championship season is an international rally championship sanctioned by the FIA. The championship is contested by a combination of regulations with Group N competing directly against Super 2000 cars for points. While the majority of competitors are privately funded, Malaysian manufacturer Proton enters a factory team of Super 2000 Proton Satria's for Australian driver Chris Atkinson and Scot Alister McRae.

British driver Alister McRae won the championship by fourteen points from Chris Atkinson of Australia as he clinched in the final round of the championship held in China.

Race calendar and results
The 2011 APRC is as follows:

* - Competitor not registered for Asia-Pacific Rally Championship.

Championship standings
The 2011 APRC for Drivers points is as follows:

Note: 1 – 7 refers to the bonus points awarded for each leg of the rally for the first five place getters, 1st (7), 2nd (5), 3rd (3), 4th (2), 5th (1). There are two bonus legs for each rally.

References

External links
Official website
APRC Live Podcast
APRC News and Video

Asia-Pacific Rally Championship seasons
Asia-Pacific
Rally
Rally